The Proclamation for Suppressing of Pirates (also known simply as the Act of Grace) was issued by George I of Great Britain on 5 September 1717. It promised a royal pardon for acts of piracy committed before the following 5 January to those pirates who surrendered themselves to the correct authority before a deadline. Originally, the surrender had to occur on or before 5 September 1718; this was later extended by a second proclamation to 1 July 1719.

The proclamation also included bounties for the capture of pirates who failed to surrender before the deadline, as well as offering rewards for pirate crew members facilitating the capture of their captains.

Background

Precedent

Kings James I, James II and William III issued similar pardons or proclamations in the prior century.

Pardons under James I
With the end of the first Anglo-Spanish war under James I, and the corresponding end to English privateering in 1603, English sailors resorted to piracy. In 1611, Captain Richard Bishop became one of the first notable pirates to be pardoned, having surrendered partly due to qualms about attacking English ships. He was allowed to keep his plunder.

In 1611, the English government was willing to offer a general pardon to pirates, on condition that they surrender their ships and goods. The following year, the privy council of James I offered a general pardon without this condition. At least 12 pirate crews surrendered to the general pardon, though a large portion of Baughe's crew would shortly return to piracy. Captain Roger Middleton, who sailed first to Ireland then to Mehdya to deliver the pardon, extracted bribes from pirates in exchange for their pardon.

The lack of competing pirates in Ireland due to the general pardon saw Henry Mainwaring become notorious in 1613 as leader of a pirate fleet. He would receive offers from Tuscany, Savoy, Tunis and Spain of a pardon should he surrender; however, consistent with his not attacking English ships, in June 1616 he instead accepted an English offer of pardon, having sought one since the previous year (as too had Lording Barry).

Clive Senior suggests that the government had an incentive to pardon pirates, since this would keep these potentially useful seamen available in case of war.

1687/8 proclamation
Around the 1670s, an expedition to suppress piracy in the Spanish West Indies using pardons was planned, but never went ahead.

On 22 May 1687, James II renewed the proclamation for the suppression of pirates, offering a limited time in which any pirate who surrendered would receive a pardon. That August, he commissioned Sir Robert Holmes to suppress piracy in a squadron sent to the West Indies. On 20 January 1687/8, James II issued a proclamation (offering pardons to pirates who surrendered to Holmes or to an appointee of his) in order to ensure that colonial governors would cooperate with Holmes and his agents. Holmes' fleet achieved a temporary reduction in piracy, but the number of pirates had increased again by 1693.

1698 proclamation

On 8 December 1698, William III issued a proclamation offering pardons to pirates east of the Cape of Good Hope who surrendered to Captain Thomas Warren. Henry Every and William Kidd were specifically exempted from receiving this pardon.

By the time that Warren arrived in Madagascar, the Act of Grace had expired. By promising to extend the deadline for surrender, Warren obtained the surrender of Robert Culliford, among others; however, these pirates were taken to trial and all except Culliford were hanged. The fact that pirates such as Joseph Bradish and those in Kidd's company were not offered amnesty by the authorities contributed to scepticism regarding acts of grace, including among the crew of Bartholomew Roberts more than two decades later.

Peace of Utrecht

With armistices in 1712, followed by the Peace of Utrecht in 1713, the state of war (which had existed since 1702 as part of the War of the Spanish Succession) between England/Great Britain on one side and France and Spain on the other came to an end. Employment for sailors became difficult to find and poorly paid, as privateering commissions became useless and as the Royal Navy discharged over 36,000 men (nearly three-quarters of those it had employed). In spite of the peace, Spanish guardas costas continued to seize English ships (based on their possession of Spanish coin), harming and imprisoning English sailors, as well as discouraging the merchant shipping which would otherwise have offered legitimate employment. This led some sailors to resort to piracy.

Anti-piracy campaign
In 1715, a Royal Navy anti-piracy campaign began in earnest. No pirate ships were captured till 1717, the year that  caused the destruction of a pirate galley and a sloop near Saint Croix, but failed to capture the crew. At this time, some 20–30 pirate vessels remained at sea.

The reasons for the campaign's ineffectiveness till 1718 included the vastness of the seas in which pirates operated, pirates' better knowledge of those seas, outdated intelligence, and a desire to cut costs (which resulted in a lack of ships, maintenance and seamen). The campaign's initial lack of success saw the British government resort to offering pardons to pirates by issuing the proclamation of 1717.

1717 proclamation

Support for a pardon
For several months, piracy in the West Indies – particularly around Jamaica – had been such a problem for the merchants and masters of ships of Bristol that they petitioned the king for its suppression. Following receipt of this petition, in May 1717, Secretary of State Joseph Addison asked the Council of Trade and Plantations to recommend to the king how best to achieve this. Having consulted merchants and other interested parties, the council agreed that the issue was urgent, replying that "the whole trade from Great Britain to those parts" was "in imminent danger of being lost". The council heard that piracy even reached the seas near the northern continent, and that at least one fourth-rate or two fifth-rates were required to suppress it. In addition, the consultees proposed a royal pardon for pirates who surrendered themselves; the council hoped that this would reform the pirates into law-abiding subjects. Finally, the council recommended that the Bahamas be settled and fortified to prevent pirates from sheltering there.

Meanwhile in Virginia, Lieutenant-Governor Alexander Spotswood recommended reducing the number of pirates either by force (to serve as a deterrent), or by offering a pardon to those who would submit – although he doubted that all the pirates would accept such an offer.

In August 1717, soon-to-be Governor of Jamaica Nicholas Lawes advocated both royal clemency and an increased presence of warships to reduce the number of pirates and protect Jamaican trade. The pirates themselves threatened to attack Bermuda and (according to Lieutenant-Governor Bennett) "make a new Madagascar of it" if they were not offered a pardon, communicating this through the masters of captured ships.

Contents

Following a justification for the proclamation, the text defines who it is pirates may surrender to and by what date.

The proclamation also defined the following bounties for the capture of pirates who failed to surrender before the deadline.

It further offered the following rewards for pirate crew members facilitating the capture of their captains.

1718 proclamation

Support for a new proclamation
Given the preparation of commissions to pardon acts of piracy which had occurred before 23 July 1718 (as opposed to 5 January, as in the original proclamation), that month the Council of Trade and Plantations directed governors to issue proclamations with this new date, and suggested that the king do the same. On 9 December, the council also recommended a further extension of the date, hoping to dissuade pirates from entering Spanish service during the War of the Quadruple Alliance.

Contents

Response

Legal opinion
In November 1717, Attorney General Edward Northey and Solicitor General William Thomson provided their legal opinion regarding the proclamation:
The proclamation did not contain a pardon, but promised one;
Murders committed during acts of piracy could be pardoned;
Pirates would not have to forfeit their property, but property taken unlawfully could be retaken by its lawful owner;
No pirate who surrendered before the deadline was excepted from the promise of a pardon.

Furthermore, by late February 1718, it was decided that governors would require a commission under the Great Seal in order to grant royal pardons as promised by the proclamation. Such commissions were ordered and prepared that July; in addition, governors were then permitted to pardon acts of piracy which occurred before 23 July 1718 (as opposed to the original date of 5 January 1717/8). (Lt. Governor Spotswood and Governor Rogers received commissions for which this date was 18 August.) In the days following the 1718 proclamation, updated commissions were once again ordered and sent.

New Providence
When news of the proclamation reached Bermuda, Lieutenant-Governor Benjamin Bennett sent his son in December 1717 to the Republic of Pirates on New Providence. The arrival of Bennett's son with copies of the proclamation caused the pirates there to divide into two factions, depending on whether they planned to accept the pardon. The faction rejecting the pardon included Jacobites, and was led by Charles Vane. Those rejecting the pardon supported fortifying the island, as did those wishing to secure their plunder, but when a general council was called, no action was agreed on.

While the Jacobites sought support from George Camocke, other pirates sailed to nearby British colonies to receive a pardon, including Henry Jennings and around 150 others who sailed to Bermuda, most of whom would return to piracy. The likes of Christopher Condent, Christopher Winter and Nicholas Brown fled New Providence, with Winter and Brown sailing to Spanish Cuba.

Pearse's crew was informed of how to find Vane by pirates intending to accept the pardon. Although Vane's crew was apprehended and his sloop, the Lark, taken, pirates Hornigold, Leslie, Burgess and Nichols persuaded Pearse to release Vane and his crew as a show of good faith.

Though Pearse lacked the authority to issue pardons, he offered signed certificates to pirates who would surrender to him. 209 accepted this offer, less than half of the pirates on New Providence. Pearse produced a list of their names:

Having already returned to piracy and attacked the crew of the Phoenix, on 4 April, Vane left New Providence on the recaptured Lark. Pearse and the Phoenix left four days later. Vane would return in late April, and again in July.

Arrival of Governor Rogers

On 24 July 1718, the new Governor of the Bahamas, Woodes Rogers, arrived off Hog Island (near Nassau), along with a series of vessels which included three Royal Navy warships. The following day, Vane left New Providence and escaped this force with Charles Yeats on Yeats' ship Katherine.

When he set foot on New Providence on 27 July, Rogers was welcomed by pro-pardon pirates, including Thomas Walker, Hornigold, and Hornigold's and Josiah Burgess's crews. (Burgess and Hornigold had already been pardoned by this time.) On 1 August, Rogers' new council granted the King's Pardon to some 200 pirates. Edward England, having been among those rejecting the pardon, sailed to Africa after this.

Following its departure on 10 September, the crew of the Buck (a sloop-of-war taken to New Providence by Rogers, now with reformed pirates among its crew) turned pirate. The Buck's new pirate crew included reformed pirates Thomas Anstis and Howell Davis, as well as a man who had come from England aboard the Buck, Walter Kennedy. Moreover, Rogers estimated that 150 pirates had left New Providence between the end of July and late October, including pirates hoping to join Vane. Indeed, that October saw the departure of three sloops, which two days later experienced a mutiny led by pardoned pirates John Auger, Phineas Bunce and Dennis McCarthy.

Due to the threat from both committed pirates and the Spanish (particularly after news of the War of the Quadruple Alliance arrived in March 1719), Rogers employed pardoned ex-pirates as pirate hunters and privateers. These included Hornigold, John Cockram and Burgess. By the end of November 1718, the pirate hunters had captured more than 10 prisoners, including Nicholas Woodall. Eight such previously pardoned prisoners, including Auger and McCarthy, would be hanged that December.

Rogers received a commission to pardon in January 1719. That month, he wrote of his doubts that most remaining pirates would surrender, stating that reducing their numbers would be difficult without a greater presence of naval vessels under a governor's control.

Having heard of the extension to the pardon, "Calico Jack" Rackham sailed to Nassau where, in May 1719, he received it. There, he met Anne Bonny and joined Burgess on a privateering mission. In August 1720, Rackham, Bonny and Mary Read (another already-pardoned pirate) stole a sloop and returned to piracy.

Bermuda
In February 1718, Lt. Governor Bennett was optimistic about the pardon, reporting that he had been giving certificates to pirates who surrendered, and requesting instructions regarding how to ensure surrendered pirates would receive their pardon. The need for such instructions became more pressing as pirates became impatient to leave Bermuda. The following March, Bennett reported that there were pirates who refused to take the pardon without assurance that they would be allowed to keep their plunder. From March to July, Bennett's worsening predicament was repeatedly relayed to Secretary of State James Craggs by the Council of Trade and Plantations, which also blamed the fact that surrendered pirates were returning to piracy on governors' lack of any power to pardon without a commission. Bennett would receive this commission by the following October.

Around April 1718, Henry Jennings took a privateering commission from Bennett to hunt Charles Vane.

A year later, shortly after news of the War of the Quadruple Alliance arrived in New Providence, pirates from the Bahamas surrendered to Bennett in April 1719 and received the king's pardon. That May, more pirates surrendered on condition that they be allowed to keep their plunder. Bennett reported that the pardon was working, since he was now only aware of ongoing piracy by Christopher Condent and Edward England.

Blackbeard

Blackbeard heard of the proclamation around 5 December 1717, from the captain of a sloop which he had attacked. Around early May 1718, on New Providence, about 300 of his roughly 700 men left his company, some intending to take the King's Pardon. During his blockade of Charles Town around the end of that month, Blackbeard rejected a pardon from Governor Robert Johnson.

Around early June, near Beaufort, North Carolina, Blackbeard allowed Stede Bonnet to sail to Bath to be pardoned by Governor Charles Eden. With Bonnet away, Blackbeard and about 100 others took the entire company's plunder – including Bonnet's share – and sailed to Bath along a different route, where they too received the King's Pardon.

Blackbeard and Bonnet would each return to piracy, Blackbeard using the veneer of legality afforded to him by Eden and his pardon, and Bonnet attempting to conceal his identity. Bonnet would later be executed, and Blackbeard would be killed while fighting Virginia authorities. Quartermaster William Howard, already convicted and sentenced, was pardoned after he was made aware that the deadline for surrendering had been extended, while Israel Hands (who had also been convicted) was pardoned, apparently for testifying against corrupt North Carolina officials.

South Carolina
In June 1718, about two weeks after Blackbeard's blockade of Charles Town, Governor Johnson opined that the proclamation of pardon was ineffective due to the number of recipients who returned to piracy, believing that the proclamation had proved to be an encouragement to pirates, and that the number of pirates had tripled since its publication.

During Charles Vane's blockade of Charles Town around 30 August 1718, Charles Yeats defected from Vane's command and, with a cargo of Guinean slaves, surrendered to Governor Johnson in exchange for a pardon.

Jamaica
From February to March 1718, Commander in Chief of Jamaica Peter Heywood reported that a considerable number of pirates had surrendered, including Hornigold. However, that August, the council and assembly reported that the pirates were numerous in spite of the proclamation. Governor Nicholas Lawes' commission to pardon arrived by the following October.

When the proclamation of 1718 was read and news of the War of the Quadruple Alliance arrived in March 1719, Governor Lawes wrote of his expectation that more pirates would surrender, the pirates having "long wish[ed] for" such a war. He also remarked that more pirates would have surrendered beforehand had they not been supplied with necessities and information from people on shore. The following month, Lawes discussed how the proclamation was ambiguous regarding whether pirates who could not return stolen property to its lawful owner should be imprisoned, explaining that a prosecution against Henry Jennings which had highlighted this ambiguity had also dissuaded pirates from surrendering.

Henry Jennings and Leigh Ashworth became privateers based in Jamaica. Ashworth resumed his piracy in May 1719.

Elsewhere
Governors Robert Hunter (of New York) and Samuel Shute (of Massachusetts and New Hampshire) each wrote of the proclamation's ineffectiveness in June 1718. In Virginia, due to fears that former pirates would return to piracy, a proclamation was issued that July to restrict their carrying arms or assembling in large numbers.

Commissions to pardon pirates arrived in New England by that September, in Barbados by October, in the Leeward Islands by November, in Virginia by December 1718, and in Nova Scotia by March 1719.

In December 1718, Secretary of State James Craggs warned governors against illegally receiving bribes in exchange for accepting pirates' surrender.

As the Caribbean became less hospitable to pirates, Africa became the destination of Olivier Levasseur, Edward England and Paulsgrave Williams.

See also
Amnesty
Indemnity Act 1717
Piracy Act 1717
Piracy Act 1721

Notes

References

Bibliography

External links
Text of the proclamation from 1717 in The London Gazette (original typesetting)
Text of the proclamations from 1688, 1717 and 1718 (pp. 140–142, 176–180, modern typesetting)

1710s in the Caribbean
1717 in law
1717 in the British Empire
George I of Great Britain
Pardon legislation
Piracy in the United Kingdom
Piracy law
Proclamations
Piracy in the Caribbean